Ali Jawad (born 1985 in Basra) is an Iraqi football player, he played as a forward for Iraq national football team.

Honours

Club

Al-Zawraa
Iraqi Elite Cup: 2003

References

External links
 
 

1985 births
Living people
Sportspeople from Basra
Iraq international footballers
Al-Mina'a SC players
Al-Baqa'a Club players
Tishreen SC players
Duhok SC players
Naft Al-Basra SC players
Iraqi expatriate footballers
Expatriate footballers in Jordan
Expatriate footballers in Syria
Iraqi footballers
Association football forwards